Altobunus is a genus of harvestmen in the family Sclerosomatidae from Celebes and the Philippines.

Species
 Altobunus formosus Roewer, 1910
 Altobunus inermis (Simon, 1877)
 Altobunus maculatus Roewer, 1910

References

Harvestman genera
Sclerosomatidae